The Pakistan Islands Development Authority; abbreviated as PIDA) is an agency of federal government of Pakistan responsible for Pakistan Islands located in Arabian Sea along with the Sindh and Balochistan coastal belt.

Formation 
Pakistan Islands Development Authority formulated via Presidential ordinance on 2 September 2020 and after a month later it came in news. The 'Pakistan Island Development Authority Ordinance 2020' on the website of the Ministry of Maritime Affairs was issued on the 2nd of last month and the 25-page ordinance provides for the development of islands off the coasts of Balochistan and Sindh. The Pakistan Island Development Authority has been set up. Its first and current chairman is Mr. Imran Amin.

The federal government intends to build modern cities on all these uninhabited islands off the coast of the country (Sindh and Balochistan), arguing that not only investment can come to the country but also the local people can prosper.

The work began with two islands off the coast of Sindh. However this development has strongly been criticized and resisted, arguing it not only disturbs and damages natural ecosystems, but also disturbs the simplistic lifestyle of the local people of the area, who have vowed to resist it. The federal governments move has also been condemned as unconstitutional.

Pakistan Islands Development Authority Ordinance

According to the ordinance, all the islands on the coasts of Balochistan and Sindh, including Bundal and Buddo, are now owned by the federation and have been placed in Schedule-I. The Ordinance, citing the Territorial Waters and Maritime Zones Act, 1976, states that up to 12 nautical miles from coast to sea will now be considered the property of the Authority.

According to the ordinance, the authority will have its office in Karachi and will be headed by the Prime Minister of Pakistan himself.

A board of five to 11 members will also be formed to run the affairs of the authority. The board will be chaired by a chairman who will be elected for five years.
According to the authority given to the authority, this authority also has the power to transfer, use, collect taxes and sell the lands of these islands. According to Article 49 of the Ordinance, it cannot be challenged in any court.

Sindh Assembly and provincial cabinet of Sindh has rejected the ordinance.

Dispute
People of Sindh have severe concerns and rejected federal authority over the provincial costal islands, because the costal territory of 18 nautical miles is under jurisdiction of respective province i.e. Sindh, and the Pakistan federal government boundaries starts after 18 nautical miles till reaching the international sea water boundary.  The idea of building a modern city on the islands did not come suddenly to the federation. Its links date back to the Musharraf era.

Federal government took direct control over the islands of province  Ordinance was challenged in Sindh High Court.

The islands were first mentioned in the media in 2006 when the then government wanted to build the world's most modern cities on the islands, and for that, it approached a UAE construction group for investment and multi-investment. Was prepared.

According to a press statement issued by the then Federal Minister for Shipping and Ports, Babar Ghauri, “The federal government has completed a basic survey to settle the city on islands in the sea, a new city master plan has been drawn up and this new More than a dozen high-level meetings have been held to populate the city. The main stakeholder of this project is Karachi Port Trust.

But political problems in the country did not allow the Musharraf government to take over, and with the fall of the government, the plan fell into disrepair.

The controversy resurfaced in 2013. Even then, the federal government wanted to invest heavily here, and a  45 billion investment deal was being struck.

This time the deal was being struck with a celebrity from Pakistan's construction sector who wanted to build modern buildings here with a group from the United Arab Emirates.

But pressure from civil society and the provincial government once again saved the islands.

Environment issues 
Fishermen will lose livelihood and ecosystem will be at risk by developing urban infrastructure over the islands.

References

External links 
 Ministry of Maritime Affairs

Pakistan federal departments and agencies
2020 establishments in Pakistan
Government agencies established in 2020
Arabian Sea
Ministry of Maritime Affairs (Pakistan)